Saint Petersburg is an unincorporated community in Logan County, in the U.S. state of Colorado.

The community derives its name from Pete Lousberg, who built the town a church in exchange for the naming rights.

References

Unincorporated communities in Logan County, Colorado
Unincorporated communities in Colorado